The , from its founding in 1933 to the end of World War II in 1945, used ranks similar to other air forces at the time; however, some Luftwaffe ranks had no equivalent in the Allied air forces. While many ranks might have equivalents in other air forces, in reality the Luftwaffe military had a far greater responsibility; while officers of the Royal Air Force, the British Air Force, were graded to a higher rank when performing higher rank functions, Luftwaffe officers maintained their rank while performing functions, regardless of size of the responsibility assigned to them.

Luftwaffe

Condor Legion

See also
 World War II German Army ranks and insignia
 Corps colours of the Luftwaffe (1935–45)
 Luftwaffe personnel structure

References
Citations

Bibliography
 
 

 

 

Luftwaffe
Military insignia